Michael, Mike or Mick McCarthy may refer to:

Arts and entertainment
Michael McCarthy (choirmaster), British-American choral director
Michael McCarthy (film director) (1917–1959), director of It's Never Too Late
Michael McCarthy (singer) (born 1966), Irish musical theatre performer
Michael McCarthy (1942–1979), British rock musician better known as Mike Patto
Mike McCarthy (producer) (born 1965), American record producer
Mike McCarthy (Australian singer-songwriter)

Politicians
Michael McCarthy (politician) (born 1976), Irish Labour Party politician
Michael J. McCarthy (politician) (1890–1955), American politician in Massachusetts
Mike McCarthy (Vermont politician), member of the Vermont House of Representatives

Sportsmen
Michael McCarthy (Australian footballer) (born 1957), Hawthorn premiership player
Michael McCarthy (cyclist) (born 1968), American cyclist
Michael McCarthy (Gaelic footballer), Irish Gaelic footballer from Kerry
Michael W. McCarthy (born 1971), American thoroughbred racehorse trainer
Mike McCarthy (baseball) (born 1987), American baseball coach
Mike McCarthy (gridiron football executive) (born 1953), football executive and scout
Mick McCarthy (footballer, born 1911) (1911–1973), Irish football goalkeeper
Mick McCarthy (born 1959), English-born Irish football manager and former player
Mick McCarthy (Gaelic footballer) (1965–1998), Irish sportsperson
Mike McCarthy (born 1963), head coach of the National Football League's Green Bay Packers from 2006 to 2018, and from the Dallas Cowboys from 2020 to the present
Mike McCarthy (rugby union) (born 1981), English-born Irish rugby union player

Others
Michael McCarthy (journalist) (born ), British environmentalist, naturalist, journalist and writer
Mike McCarthy (journalist), British television journalist
Michael McCarthy (Irish lawyer) (1864–1928), Irish lawyer and anti-clerical author
Michael McCarthy (bishop), Roman Catholic bishop in Queensland, Australia
Michael J. McCarthy (general), U.S. Air Force general
Michael M. McCarthy (1845–1914), Canadian US Army soldier and Medal of Honor recipient
Michael A. McCarthy, American diplomat

See also
MacCarthy dynasty